WUOG (90.5 FM) is a student-run college radio station licensed in Athens, Georgia. The station serves the Athens area and is currently owned by the University of Georgia.

History
The station first broadcast on October 16, 1972, with a 3,200 watt signal.  In 1977, WUOG's wattage was increased to 10,000 watts, and in 1994 the station reached its current 26,000 watts, making it one of the most powerful college stations in the country. The transmitter sits atop  on the UGA campus, broadcasting at an effective radius of 60 miles or 100 km.

With the exception of a period of time in 1981 and 2005 when the station was shut down for non-compliance of Federal Communications Commission (FCC) rules, WUOG has operated for 18 to 24 hours each day.  The station is maintained and run entirely by a 200-student staff of volunteers. 18 executive members oversee the staff and the day-to-day operation of the station.

WUOG offers regular rotation programming as well as specialty shows.  "Rotation" consists of new and old music of any genre that falls within the bounds of WUOG's music philosophy.  Once stated as the axiom "If they don't need us, we don't need them", the music philosophy strives to include artists whose music is rarely heard elsewhere.  WUOG also carries specialty show programming ranging from Middle Eastern music to new wave, oldies to bluegrass music. News shows, talk shows and sports shows air throughout the week. The program "Live in the Lobby," broadcast on Tuesday and Thursday each week, features live on air in-studio sessions from local Georgia musical artists.

It was on WUOG that R.E.M. were first broadcast; a live recording of "Hippy, Hippy Shake" was played in the summer of 1980. Drummer Bill Berry was also in a short-lived combo of radio personalities from the station, known as the WUOGerz.

In late June 2006, it was discovered that the station was causing electromagnetic interference to a nuclear chemistry laboratory on campus.  To alleviate this, the station temporarily went off-air on weekdays from 7AM and resumed broadcast at 4PM, as well as late nights and weekends, while the lab work was done.  Electronic filters eliminated the problem on July 13, allowing WUOG to return to a normal schedule.   

On February 21, 2009 the lobby of the new WUOG station inside of Tate was named in honor of Wilbur Herrington. The Wilbur Herrington Lobby memorializes Wilbur's service as station engineer since the station's first broadcast in 1972.  Herrington had received help in the early stages of applying for an FCC license from broadcast engineers at Athens commercial station WRFC(AM) (960 kHz), chiefly Larry Melear (a graduate of the UGA School of Broadcasting) and Everett Langford.

Shows

2 Girls, 1 Cat — A talk show about cats.
3 Missed Calls — Eclectic mix of moody electronic and R&B. (Last Active Fall 2015)
Afternoon Twee - Twee pop. (Active Fall 2012)
AM in the PM — Weekly sports program filled to the brim with news, commentary, and the occasional insult.
The Asian Equation — Your weekly source of discussion surrounding Asian culture and identity! (Formerly known as The East Side From the East) (Last active Spring 2020)
Athenian Eats — Covering the Athens food scene weekly on 90.5
Athens Journal — Flagship news from WUOG.
Beyond The Hedges — A morning drive time talk show.
Boiling Point — Punk and hardcore from the 70s to today.
The Discourse Docket — Just two bros dissecting the news through the lens of the progressive left and providing local activists with a platform to share their ideas. (Formerly, the Brogressive Left)
Crisis — Noise and experimental.
D90.5 — Danger! Adventure! Graph paper! WUOG's DJs play some good ol' fashioned Dungeons and Dragons on-air 
Film Thing — All things cinema, spoiler-free.
Friday Pregame Show — A weekly show taking an irreverent look at the world of sports.
Friendly Folk — Psychedelic folk, anti-folk and other hyphenated folk genres.(Last active Spring 2012)
Folk Scene — Gospel, old time folk music, and classics.
God Save the Queen — Brit-pop and all music from the UK.
Global Warming — International music.
Happening Thing — 1960s garage rock, hard psychedelia, freakbeat, and assorted proto-punk. 
Heretic Harvest 
Halftime Hip-Hop Show — Underground hip-hip, R&B and rap. 
High Noon Sports Show — Flagship sports news program.
Jitters & Rags — 1940s, 1950s, and 1960s pop, swing, and big band. (first on air in 2007)
Keeping it Classy - Classical music.
Khmer Groove - East Asian pop music. 
Lavender Pillow — 1.5 hrs of ambient music.
Live in the Lobby — Local bands playing for live and radio audiences. Followed by "Sound of the City" featuring bands from Athens and Atlanta.
Miliki Sound System — Pop music from all over Africa. Formerly known as Afrika.
Odd Man Out — Female vocalists.
Organic Compound - Electronic music, has taken different perspectives depending on the DJ who hosts.
Parties & Parodies — D&D 3.5 live on the air.
Perfect Sound Forever — Music from the 90s.
Pining for the Fjords - Music from the Netherlands and surrounding areas.
Purple Cow — Spoken word, poetry, and readings from literature.
Player's Picnic — Funk, soul, and R&B.
Radio Rx — Pharmacy-related topics and more.
Road Trip USA — Music from a weekly featured US city. 
Saturdays Are For The Kids — "Young or old, big or small, Saturday mornings are fun for all!" Dedicated to playing kid-friendly music the whole family can enjoy 
Smoke and Monitors — Vaporwave. 
Souvenirs — Dance music spanning the decades. Formerly known as Paradise Garage.
Soft Scaley Underbelly — DJs are allowed to play artists that have charted in the Billboard Top 50, who would otherwise be considered "out of philosophy" for the station.
Talk of the Town — Athens talk from the people who know it best.
TechNight — Your weekly roundup of the digital world!
Tuesday Triple Play — A Sports Show about Sports and other stuff. 
Untied — Shoegaze and dream-pop. (Active Fall 2012)
Writing for Now — (Last active Spring 2011)
Yeoboseyo! — Your local source for K-Groove and K-Wave sounds to expand your palette of Korean music further.

See also
Music of Athens, Georgia
Athens, GA: Inside Out

References

External links

 http://www.wuog.org/

University of Georgia
UOG
UOG
Radio stations established in 1972